The First Shadow Cabinet of Harold Wilson was created on 14 February 1963 following the death of Hugh Gaitskell on 18 January 1963.

Shadow Cabinet list

See also

List of British governments
Official Opposition of the United Kingdom

References 

Official Opposition (United Kingdom)
British shadow cabinets
Shadow cabinets
1963 in British politics
1963 establishments in the United Kingdom
1964 disestablishments in the United Kingdom
Labour Party (UK) shadow cabinets